is a sub-kilometer asteroid, classified as near-Earth object of the Apollo group, that flew by Earth on 26 July 2013 at about 9 lunar distances It is reported to be about  in diameter.

 was detected by the Catalina Sky Survey on January 24, 2006.

Some other NEOs noted for there Earth flybys in the summer of 2013, include 2009 FE (June 4, 2013 at 9.6 LD), 2003 DZ15 (on July 29, 2013 passed at 7.6 LD), and  2005 WK4 (on August 9, 2013 passed at 8.1 LD).

See also
 List of asteroid close approaches to Earth in 2013
 (Passed at 15 LD on May 31, 2013 with a size between 1-3 km)

References

External links 
 
 

Minor planet object articles (unnumbered)

20060124